Forest is a census-designated place (CDP) in eastern Bedford County, Virginia, United States. The population was 11,709 at the 2020 census. It is part of the Lynchburg Metropolitan Statistical Area.

Geography
Forest is located at  (37.370723, −79.266801).

Economy
Forest is a suburban part of metropolitan Lynchburg, containing many subdivided properties carved from and around surrounding farms and woodlands. The Ivy Hill community is the largest development and is built around the Ivy Hill Golf Course. The community has been experiencing rapid growth and development over the past 20 years, especially after U.S. Route 221 (Forest Road) was widened to four lanes in 2009. The growth of commercial businesses and housing, which slowed during the Great Recession, is expected to continue into the near future.

Forest has no real town center since the original one was torn down without a trace, but the area along Forest Road from the post office to the Forest Library is generally regarded as the central part of the community; however, the community extends all the way along Forest Road from the middle school to Graves Mill Shopping Center. The political attitudes of the majority of the population are conservative. There are a few older homes along a loop behind the library and two churches that would have been in close proximity to the former Norfolk & Western rail station, which was torn down in the late 2010s. This might have been considered the main stop for Forest prior to sub-urbanization and commercial development along Forest Road.

Liberty University's Center for Engineering Research and Education (CERE) in the New London Business & Technology Center park on U.S. Route 460 in New London is a small but increasingly significant engineering center developed with partnerships by private industry, regional governments, the Tobacco Commission, in addition to the University. Existing businesses in the park include Simplimatic Automation, NanoSeptic Technologies, and a 40,000 square foot shell building is available for sale or lease.

Demographics

2020 census
As of the census of 2020, there were 11,709 people residing in the CDP. There were 5,012 housing units. The racial makeup of the CDP was 82.5% White, 6.8% African American or Black, 0.2% American Indian, 3.4% Asian, 0.0% Pacific Islander, 1.1% from other races, and 6.0% from two or more races. Hispanic or Latino of any race were 4.0% of the population.

2010 census
As of the census of 2010, there were 9,106 people residing in the CDP. There were 3,922 housing units. The racial makeup of the CDP was 87.8% White, 7.2% African American or Black, 0.1% American Indian, 3.0% Asian, 0.0% Pacific Islander, 0.9% from other races, and 0.9% from two or more races. Hispanic or Latino of any race were 2.9% of the population.

2000 census
As of the census of 2000, there were 8,006 people, 3,172 households, and 2,293 families residing in the CDP. The population density was 547.8 people per square mile (211.6/km2). There were 3,294 housing units at an average density of 225.4/sq mi (87.1/km2). The racial makeup of the CDP was 91.79% White, 5.65% African American, 0.10% Native American, 1.36% Asian, 0.01% Pacific Islander, 0.27% from other races, and 0.81% from two or more races. Hispanic or Latino of any race were 0.95% of the population.

There were 3,172 households, out of which 35.8% had children under the age of 18 living with them, 62.9% were married couples living together, 7.2% had a female householder with no husband present, and 27.7% were non-families. 24.5% of all households were made up of individuals, and 5.8% had someone living alone who was 65 years of age or older. The average household size was 2.52 and the average family size was 3.03.

In the CDP the population was spread out, with 26.9% under the age of 18, 6.1% from 18 to 24, 31.5% from 25 to 44, 26.0% from 45 to 64, and 9.5% who were 65 years of age or older. The median age was 38 years. For every 100 females there were 96.8 males. For every 100 females age 18 and over, there were 92.6 males.

The median income for a household in the CDP was $55,089, and the median income for a family was $67,055. Males had a median income of $46,057 versus $30,720 for females. The per capita income for the CDP was $25,735. About 2.9% of families and 3.1% of the population were below the poverty line, including 1.3% of those under age 18 and 3.7% of those age 65 or over.

Government
The United States Postal Service operates the Forest Post Office within the CDP.

Law enforcement is provided by the Bedford County Sheriff's Office. Fire protection is provided by the Forest Volunteer Fire Company, which operates a fire station within the CDP. Emergency medical services are provided by the Campbell County Volunteer Rescue Squad and Bedford County Department of Fire and Rescue, which operates from a station within the CDP.

Education
The CDP is served by Bedford County Public Schools. Public school students residing in Forest are zoned to attend one of four nearby elementary schools, Forest Middle School, and Jefferson Forest High School. A private school, Timberlake Christian School, is also located in neighboring Timberlake.

The closest higher education institutions to the CDP are located in Bedford and Lynchburg.

Infrastructure
The Bedford Regional Water Authority maintains public water and wastewater systems in the CDP.

A partnership with a subsidiary of Blue Ridge Towers and Bedford County to increase broadband access throughout Forest and the entire county is also underway.

Transportation

Airports
The nearest airport offering commercial service is Lynchburg Regional Airport, which offers flights through American Airlines to Charlotte, North Carolina. Private charter flights are available through Virginia Aviation. There is also a public general aviation (GA) airport, New London Airport, which is open for all GA pilots.

Roads
 US Route 221

Rail
The closest passenger rail service is located at Kemper Street station in Lynchburg, which is a stop for Amtrak's Crescent and Northeast Regional trains.

Attractions and entertainment
A popular attraction of Forest is Poplar Forest, the summer home of Thomas Jefferson, which is open to the public for visitation and is the subject of ongoing archaeological studies. The home is also used for events. Nearby attractions include Point of Honor in Lynchburg, the National D-Day Memorial in Bedford, and the Peaks of Otter in the Blue Ridge Mountains.

Notable people
John Early (bishop), Methodist Episcopal Church, South was "of Forest neighborhood."
Cynthia Dunbar, Republican National Committeewoman for Virginia; law professor at Liberty University School of Law, former member of the Texas State Board of Education.
Rashad Jennings, NFL running back formerly for the New York Giants, the Oakland Raiders, and the Jacksonville Jaguars.

References

External links
Photos of Forest

Census-designated places in Bedford County, Virginia